Tatyana Ivanovna Sidorenko (born 4 July 1964) is a former Soviet, Russian and Croatian competitive volleyball player and Olympic gold medalist. 

In the 1990s, Sidorenko played for the Croatia women's national volleyball team.

References

External links
 
 Tatyana Sidorenko biography and Olympic results, from https://www.sports-reference.com/; retrieved 2010-12-11.

Soviet women's volleyball players
Russian women's volleyball players
Olympic volleyball players of the Soviet Union
Volleyball players at the 1988 Summer Olympics
Olympic gold medalists for the Soviet Union
Medalists at the 1988 Summer Olympics
1966 births
Sportspeople from Moscow
Living people
Russian people of Ukrainian descent
Russian emigrants to Croatia
Olympic medalists in volleyball
Croatian women's volleyball players
Honoured Masters of Sport of the USSR
Competitors at the 1986 Goodwill Games
Competitors at the 1990 Goodwill Games
Goodwill Games medalists in volleyball
Croatian people of Ukrainian descent
Croatian people of Russian descent
Naturalized citizens of Croatia